Michelle Alonso Morales (born 29 March 1994, in Tenerife) is a swimmer competitor from Spain. She has been dubbed by the media as "The Little Mermaid of the Canary Islands". She is also considered one of the most important personalities of Spanish sport.

Personal 
Alonso was born 29 March 1994 and has an intellectual disability. She is from the Canary Islands. As of 2012, she lived in Tenerife. In October 2013, she was awarded the gold Real Orden al Mérito Deportivo at a ceremony at the Teatro de Madrid Cofidis, and attended by Princess Elena, Minister of Education, Culture and Sport, José Ignacio Wert, the president of the Higher Sports Council (CSD), Miguel Cardinal, and the Director General of Sports of CSD, Ana Muñoz.

Swimming 
Alonso is an S14 classified swimmer. She is affiliated with the Spanish Sports Federation for Persons with Intellectual Disability (FEddi).

In 2010, Alonso competed at the Tenerife International Open.

In 2012 Alonso competed at the Paralympic Swimming Championship of Spain by Autonomous Communities.

She raced at the 2012 Summer Paralympics in London, England where she earned a gold medal in the 100 metre breaststroke setting a new world record of 1:16.85. She competed at the 2013 IPC Swimming World Championships, where she won a gold medal in her favoured 100m breaststroke. The next year she again represented Spain, this time in the 2014 IPC Swimming European Championships. She entered four events, winning gold in the 100m breaststroke S14 breaking her own world record, set at the Paralympics, by over a second. She broke her own world record again at the 2020 Summer Paralympics, with a time of 1:12:02.

During the Tokyo 2020 Paralympic Games, Michelle led the Spanish delegation at the opening ceremony carrying the flag of Spain.

References

External links 
 
 

1994 births
Living people
Spanish female breaststroke swimmers
Spanish female freestyle swimmers
Paralympic swimmers of Spain
Paralympic gold medalists for Spain
Paralympic medalists in swimming
Swimmers at the 2012 Summer Paralympics
Swimmers at the 2016 Summer Paralympics
Medalists at the 2012 Summer Paralympics
Medalists at the 2016 Summer Paralympics
Sportspeople from Santa Cruz de Tenerife
S14-classified Paralympic swimmers
Medalists at the World Para Swimming Championships
Medalists at the World Para Swimming European Championships
21st-century Spanish women